The 1920 Minnesota lieutenant gubernatorial election took place on November 2, 1920. Republican Party of Minnesota candidate Louis L. Collins defeated Independent challenger George H. Mallon and Minnesota Democratic Party candidate James P. McDonnell.

Captain Mallon was the nominee of the young Minnesota Farmer-Labor Party. However, the Farmer-Labor nominees for Governor and Lieutenant Governor in the general election of 1920 were unable to use the Farmer-Labor party designation and ran as Independents instead.

Also among the defeated candidates was Lillian Friedman of the Socialist Party of Minnesota, who was the first woman ever to be nominated for the office of Lieutenant Governor of Minnesota, and the final nominee of the Socialist Party for that office. The 1920 general election—the first held since the ratification of the 19th Amendment—also saw the first nomination of a woman for the office of Minnesota Secretary of State: Lily J. Anderson of the Farmer-Labor Party.

Results

External links
 Election Returns

Lieutenant Gubernatorial
Minnesota
1920